Fabrice Martin and Purav Raja were the defending champions but chose not to defend their title.

Sergey Betov and Ilya Ivashka won the title after defeating Tomislav Draganja and Nino Serdarušić 1–6, 6–3, [10–4] in the final.

Seeds

Draw

References
 Main Draw

Tilia Slovenia Open - Doubles
2016 Doubles